Unconventional prefoldin RPB5 interactor, also called URI1, is a protein that in humans is encoded by the URI1 gene.

Function 

The protein encoded by this gene binds to RNA polymerase II subunit 5 (RPB5) and negatively modulates transcription through its binding to RPB5. The encoded protein seems to have inhibitory effects on various types of activated transcription, but it requires the RPB5-binding region. This protein acts as a corepressor. It is suggested that it may require signaling processes for its function or that it negatively modulates genes in the chromatin structure. Two alternatively spliced transcript variants encoding different isoforms have been described for this gene.

Interactions 

URI1 has been shown to interact with DMAP1 and STAP1.

Model organisms
Model organisms have been used in the study of URI1 function. A conditional knockout mouse line called Uri1tm1a(EUCOMM)Wtsi was generated at the Wellcome Trust Sanger Institute. Male and female animals underwent a standardized phenotypic screen to determine the effects of deletion. Additional screens performed:  - In-depth immunological phenotyping

References

External links

Further reading